General elections were held in Vanuatu on 30 November 1987. Ni-Vanuatu voters were invited to elect the 46 members of an expanded national Parliament, which had previously held 39 seats.

The ruling Vanua'aku Pati maintained its absolute majority, with 26 seats, while the Union of Moderate Parties obtained 19. The Vanua'aku Pati received slightly less than 50% of the popular vote, while the UMP received 40%. Walter Lini of the Vanua'aku Pati remained Prime Minister. Voter turnout was 71.6%.

Important issues in the election included domestic economic reforms (such as liberalising the economy) and the accommodation of the Francophone population.

Electoral system
Most members were elected through single non-transferable voting in multi-seat districts having two to six members each. Four members were elected through first-past-the-post voting.

Results

See also
List of members of the Parliament of Vanuatu (1987–1991)

References

Vanuatu
General election
Elections in Vanuatu
Vanuatu